Sally Swing is a 1938 Fleischer Studios animated short film in Max Fleischer's Betty Boop series. The short features the voice talents of Rose Marie as Sally Swing and Margie Hines as Betty Boop.

Synopsis
At the examination board, Betty asks the men if they do acrobatics or performing arts. Unfortunately, after they ended up trying a song (Goodnight, Ladies), Betty then auditions people to become bandleaders for tonight's college dance. She finally discovers a cleaning woman as the leader of the band by conducting and singing her song. Betty asks Sally to play the rest of the song continuously by annoying badly the principal of the college (Sally calls him "professor" at the end of the film).

Notes
 The titular character somewhat resembles an image of Betty Grable.

References

External links
Sally Swing on Youtube
 
 

1938 films
Betty Boop cartoons
1930s American animated films
American black-and-white films
1938 animated films
Paramount Pictures short films
Fleischer Studios short films
Short films directed by Dave Fleischer